DC Comics – The Legend of Batman is a fortnightly partwork magazine published by Eaglemoss Collections and DC Comics. The series is a collection of special edition hardback graphic novels, that tell Batman's life story from beginning to end. The series follows the success of the DC Comics Graphic Novel Collection, which itself began in 2015 with the Batman story Hush.

The collection started in countries like France, but with a different order and contents. The debut issue, Batman: Zero Year Part 1, was released in the U.K. on 27 December 2017 at the special price of £1.99 and £6.99 for the first order (including 1 free book), before rising to £9.99 per issue. In February 2019 the price was increased to £10.99 and August 2020 saw another increase to £11.99 (post Brexit).

In January 2021, Eaglemoss Collections notified subscribers that, due to its success, the collection would be extended to 100 issues.

In September 2021, a flyer was included with issue #98 ("Blood of Heroes") that confirmed a further extension of 20 issues, bringing the collection to 120 books. Of which is only available if you resubscribe and not in stores (mentioned on their website).

Eaglemoss announced they were bankrupt on 11 July 2022, the Webshop is no longer accessible and to date there have been no new subscription deliveries since December 2021.

List of books

Regular issues
Below is a list of the books which have been released as part of the collection.

Special issues
The following 'special' books are due to be released as part of the collection with a UK retail price of £19.99. Subscribers get the Special issues at a discounted price of £18.99.

Subscriber exclusive issues
The collection offers subscribers the opportunity to receive additional gifts throughout the collection by paying £1 extra per volume. The exclusive Legends of Batman books are issued every 20 issues over the course of the collection.

References

Batman titles
Comic book collection books
DC Comics titles
Partworks